The Bulletin of Geosciences is a peer-reviewed scientific journal publishing original research papers, review articles, and short contributions. It covers all aspects of palaeoenvironmental geology, including palaeontology, stratigraphy, sedimentology, palaeogeography, palaeoecology, palaeoclimatology, geochemistry, mineralogy, geophysics, and related fields.

It is published by the Czech Geological Survey, West Bohemian Museum in Plzeň, Palacký University Olomouc and the Geological institute of Czech Academy of Sciences.

Abstracting and indexing 
This journal is abstracted and indexed in:
 Science Citation Index Expanded 
 Current Contents/Physical, Chemical & Earth Sciences
 Scopus
 GeoRef
The journal is included in the Geoscience e-Journals collection. According to the Journal Citation Reports, the journal has a 2013 impact factor of 1.495.

References

External links 
 

English-language journals
Geology journals
Open access journals
Publications established in 1926
Quarterly journals
Academic journals published by governments